
Gmina Oleśnica is a rural gmina (administrative district) in Staszów County, Świętokrzyskie Voivodeship, in south-central Poland.

Demography 
According to the 2011 Poland census, there were 3,891 people residing in Oleśnica Commune, of whom 49.7% were male and 50.3% were female. In the commune, the population was spread out, with 19.3% under the age of 18, 38.9% from 18 to 44, 22.5% from 45 to 64, and 19.3% who were 65 years of age or older.
 Figure 1. Population pyramid of commune in 2010 – by age group and sex

Villages
Gmina Oleśnica contains the villages and settlements of Borzymów, Brody, Bydłowa, Kępie, Oleśnica, Pieczonogi, Podlesie, Strzelce, Sufczyce, Wojnów and Wólka Oleśnicka.

Neighbouring gminas
Gmina Oleśnica is bordered by the gminas of Łubnice, Pacanów, Rytwiany, Stopnica and Tuczępy.

References

External links
Polish official population figures 2006

Olesnica
Staszów County